Aspergillus fresenii is a species of fungus in the genus Aspergillus. Aspergillus fresenii produces ochratoxin A, ochratoxin B, ochratoxin C, aspochracins, mellamides, orthosporins, radarins, secopenitrems, sulphinines, xanthomegnins.

References

Further reading
 

 

fresenii
Fungi described in 1971